The South African motorcycle Grand Prix was a motorcycling event that had been part of the Grand Prix motorcycle racing world championship, held intermittently from 1983 to 2004.

History

The first South African Grand Prix was held in 1983 as the season opener at the Kyalami circuit in Midrand. The circuit lay more than 1700 metres above sea level and the high altitude caused problems for the riders to set up their bikes. The race was held on a Saturday, similar to the Dutch TT. In 1984 the races were plagued by bad weather conditions, resulting in many accidents. The race in 1985 was the final to be held at the old Kyalami circuit before it was removed for the 1986 season due to the Apartheid policies which were in place in the country at the time. These policies prompted the subsequent boycott from many sport associations (such as the FIM and the FIA), which refused to race in the country until the lift of these bans in the early 1990s.

After the Apartheid policies were abolished and the FIM removed the restrictions for South African riders and venues, the round returned on the calendar in 1992 on a new and shortened variant of the Kyalami circuit. The race was placed on a Sunday timeslot compared to the previous three South African GPs, which were held on a Saturday. However, due to ongoing financial and political problems going on in the country, it was decided to cancel the 1993 installment of the race which was planned for 3 October that year. This decision was made at the 1993 Italian Grand Prix.

In 1999, the South African Grand Prix returned. The venue chosen was the Phakisa Freeway in Welkom. In the 2002 event, the South African Department of Health announced a week before the Grand Prix that it was no longer allowed to advertise tobacco products in motorsports. This caused a big problem because that year's official sponsor of the race was French cigarette brand Gauloises. All the posters and programs - who were already printed and ready for distribution - had to be thrown away and quickly altered and all the teams who were sponsored by tobacco companies that year were forced to order new and censored stickers for the bikes, overalls for the riders, team clothing for the crewmembers and more. This caused significant financial damage as a result. In 2003, the start of the MotoGP race was delayed for almost one hour to clean up an oil spill from Kenny Roberts Jr.'s Suzuki. The 2004 race was the final South African Grand Prix so far and saw Valentino Rossi and Max Biaggi famously battle for the victory.

Official names and sponsors

1983: Nashua Motorcycle Grand Prix
1984: Technics Motorcycle Grand Prix
1985: National Panasonic Motorcycle Grand Prix
1992: Nashua South African Grand Prix
1999: South African Grand Prix (no official sponsor)
2000–2001: Gauloises Africa's Grand Prix
2002: Africa's Grand Prix (no official sponsor)
2003: Arnette Africa's Grand Prix
2004: betandwin.com Africa's Grand Prix

Formerly used circuits

Winners

Multiple winners (riders)

Multiple winners (manufacturers)

By year

References

 
Motorcycle racing controversies
Recurring sporting events established in 1983
Recurring sporting events disestablished in 2004
1983 establishments in South Africa
2004 disestablishments in South Africa